Victim of Love is a 1923 German silent drama film directed by Martin Hartwig and starring Lucy Doraine, Alfons Fryland, and Hermann Pfanz.

The film's sets were designed by the art director Willy Reiber.

Cast
 Lucy Doraine
 Alfons Fryland
 Hermann Pfanz
 Margarete Schlegel
 Rudolf Lettinger

References

Bibliography

External links

1923 films
Films of the Weimar Republic
Films directed by Martin Hartwig
German silent feature films
German black-and-white films
Bavaria Film films
Films shot at Bavaria Studios
Films based on works by Guy de Maupassant
German drama films
1923 drama films
Silent drama films
1920s German films
1920s German-language films